Eventive may refer to:
 Eventive aspect, a class of grammatical aspect including perfective and imperfective aspect
 Eventive mood, a variant of the irrealis grammatical mood
 Eventive passive voice or dynamic passive voice, a variant of the passive voice

See also
Event (disambiguation)